The 2014 CIK-FIA Karting Academy Trophy was the 5th season of the CIK-FIA Karting Academy Trophy, an international karting championship. Richard Verschoor clinched the title in the final race ahead of Kakunoshin Ota and Rinus VeeKay.

Standings
 Heat qualifying points

Points are awarded to the top 10.

 Feature race points

Points are awarded to the top fifteen.

Championship top 10

References

Karting World Championship